An , plural  (from , "to choose", so-called because an  was chosen by a centurion), was a position in a centuria (century) of a Roman army similar to that of an executive officer.

 were vital in the Roman army. An  was stationed at the rear of the ranks to keep the troops in order. Their duties would include enforcing the orders of the centurion, taking over the centurion's command in battle should the need arise, supervising his subordinates, and a variety of administrative duties.

 pay was double the standard legionary pay and they were the most likely men to replace the centurion if the position became vacant.

Types of 
Titles held by  included:

: chosen man on prison duty (incarceration).
:  being groomed for promotion to the rank of centurion.
:  being groomed or marked out for promotion to the rank of centurion.
: soldier in charge of the prison cells.
: soldier in charge of guard posts.
: 'chosen man among the dragon bearers', a late Roman senior standard bearer.
:  in the legionary or Praetorian cavalry ( meaning horse).
: soldier in charge of a workshop.
: soldier in charge of boats.
: soldier attached to headquarters.
:  who held supervisory rank ( from the 2nd century onwards); not all who had the title of  held this status.
:  in the elite cavalry bodyguards.
:  being groomed for promotion to the rank of centurion.
:  of military police.
: assistant to a tribune.
: orderly in charge of a hospital.

Uniform
Unlike the centurion, the cuirass was not the distinguishing part of the 's uniform. The identifying part would be his helmet; this would have had plumes of horse hair or feathers on either side of his helmet that could be accompanied by a helmet crest.  

An 's armour would be more like those of the common legionary. He could wear the lorica segmentata or a lorica hamata as well as have his gladius'' on the right, not the left, side. One thing that did separate him from the common legionary was the staff (called a ), which was used to keep the legionaries in line. This staff would be roughly as tall as the  himself.  often carried wax tablets on which they kept the orders of the day.

Vegetius on

See also
 List of Roman army unit types

References

Ancient Roman titles
Military ranks of ancient Rome